Nanchang West or Nanchangxi is a railway station on the Shanghai–Kunming and Hangzhou–Changsha high-speed lines located in Nanchang, Jiangxi, China. The foundation was laid in August 2010 and the station opened to service on 26 September 2013. Nanchangxi is serviced by two side platforms and ten island platforms.

Nanchangxi is situated on Line 2 of the Nanchang Metro, which opened on 18 August 2017.

See also
 Nanchang railway station, the central station in Nanchang

External links
 

Railway stations in Jiangxi
Railway stations in China opened in 2013